"Fotografia" is a song by Italian recording artist Carl Brave, featuring vocals by singer Francesca Michielin and rapper Fabri Fibra. It was co-written by the song's three performing artists, and produced by Carl Brave.
The song was released on 11 May 2018 as the lead single from Carl Brave's debut solo studio album, Notti brave.
After peaking at number 6 on the Italian FIMI singles chart, "Fotografia" was certified triple platinum in Italy.

Music video
The music video for the song was directed by twins Dan and Dav, and released on 14 May 2018. It is an animated video, created in the style of American series The Simpsons and set on the Lungotevere, in front of Castel Sant'Angelo. It was the 9th most popular music video of 2018 on YouTube in Italy.

Charts

Certifications

References

2018 singles
2018 songs
Francesca Michielin songs
Fabri Fibra songs
Songs written by Fabri Fibra